Frederick William Keeton (26 October 1855 — 27 November  1911) was an English cricketer who played for Derbyshire between 1876 and 1880.

Keeton was born in Mosborough, (then in Derbyshire but now in South Yorkshire) and in 1874 was playing for Worksop. He made his debut for Derbyshire during the 1876 season against Lancashire where he scored a handful of runs, and the game was lost. His next appearance was in the 1879 season in a game against Marylebone Cricket Club in which he was run out on six and lbw on five when Derbyshire  lost by fifteen runs. Keeton made his final first-class appearance during the 1880 season, when he made his top score of nine in an innings defeat to Yorkshire.

Keeton was a right-handed batsman and a right-arm medium-pace round-arm bowler who played 6 innings in 3 first-class matches with a top score of 9 and an average of 5.50. He never had the chance to bowl.

Keeton was a licensed victualler and in 1884 was licensee of the County Hotel at Chesterfield. He played a couple of games for Derbyshire in 1888 when they were out of the championship.
 
Keeton died in Bolton, Lancashire at the age of 56.

References

1855 births
1911 deaths
English cricketers
Derbyshire cricketers
People from Mosborough
Cricketers from Derbyshire